These are the most popular given names of newborns in the United States for all years of the 2000s.

References 
 Most Popular 1000 Names of the 2000s from the Social Security Administration
 Top 100 Baby Names for 2006 List
 Popular Names by Birth Year

2000s
2000s in the United States